Douglas Lange is an American football and track and field coach.  He is currently the head track and field coach at  Martin Luther College in New Ulm, Minnesota, a position he has held since 2005.  He was the head football coach at the Martin Luther from 2004 to 2015, highlighted by a 2009 conference championship and being named the Upper Midwest Athletic Conference Coach of the Year.

Head coaching record

Football

References

Year of birth missing (living people)
Living people
Martin Luther Knights football coaches
College track and field coaches in the United States